Neighbours is a 1966 Danish comedy film directed by Bent Christensen. It was entered into the 5th Moscow International Film Festival.

Cast
 Ebbe Rode as Tandlæge Gormsen
 Hanne Borchsenius as Fru Gormsen
 John Price as Fabrikant Sandelund
 Grethe Sønck as Fru Sandelund
 Peter Steen as Ludvig
 Elsebeth Reingaard as Nille
 Jesper Langberg as Freddy
 Tine Schmedes as Rikke
 Pouel Kern as Isenkræmmer Krause
 Henry Lohmann as Gartner Andersen
 Ingrid Langballe as Fru Jensen
 Karl Stegger as Betjent Holm
 Svend Bille as Bankbestyreren
 Stanley Robbson as Englænder

References

External links
 

1966 films
1966 comedy films
Danish comedy films
1960s Danish-language films
Danish black-and-white films
Films directed by Bent Christensen